Keep Calm and Carry the Monkey is the second album by Australian rock band Skipping Girl Vinegar.

The first single from the album, "One Long Week", was released in March 2011. This heralded a harder and more dynamic sound. The song was playlisted by Triple J and other Australian radio stations. The album was released two months later.

Skipping Girl Vinegar opened the 2011 Splendour in the Grass festival. Days after the festival the band released another single, "Wasted". This also achieved widespread radio airplay  and heralded the beginning of their Drown It Out tour, as did following singles "Chase the Sun", and "You Can", taken from their third album "Keep Calm Carry the Monkey".

In March 2012, the band performed on the Australian television programme Adam Hills' In Gordon Street Tonight with their single "Chase the Sun".

Chase the Sun filmclip 
The music video for single Chase the Sun involved a toy monkey the band found in hard rubbish and creating a small spacecraft made from foam, gaffa tape and a weather balloon. The monkey (Baker) was sent into the atmosphere with an onboard camera, reaching 110,000 feet and the resulting footage was incorporated into the filmclip.

Reception 
Reviews for the album were uniformly positive, with many noting the guest appearance of Canadian singer-songwriter Ron Sexsmith on the closing track 'Heart Does Ache'.

The national 'Drown it Out' tour followed, promoting the album.

Track listing 
All songs written by Skipping Girl Vinegar

 Chase the Sun
 You Can
 Hand To Hold 
 Central Station 
 Hell Out Of Town
 Moose Took Me Deep
 Castles Full Of Storms
 One Long Week
 Wasted
 Slow Steady Hand 
 Here She Comes
 Heart Does Ache

References

Skipping Girl Vinegar albums
2011 albums